Václav Veselý (13 August 1900, in Jinonice – 10 December 1941, in Řeporyje) was a Czechoslovak gymnast who competed in the 1928 Summer Olympics.

References

1900 births
1941 deaths

Czechoslovak male artistic gymnasts
Olympic gymnasts of Czechoslovakia
Gymnasts at the 1928 Summer Olympics
Olympic silver medalists for Czechoslovakia
Olympic medalists in gymnastics
Gymnasts from Prague
Medalists at the 1928 Summer Olympics